The Tanzania national cricket team is the men's team that represents Tanzania in international cricket. Cricket has been played in what is now Tanzania since 1890, and the national side first played in 1951. The Tanzania Cricket Association became an associate member of the International Cricket Council (ICC) in 2001, having previously been part of the East and Central Africa Cricket Conference, which was a member of the ICC in its own right.

In April 2018, the ICC decided to grant full Twenty20 International (T20I) status to all its members. Therefore, all Twenty20 matches played between Tanzania and other ICC members since 1 January 2019 have been full T20Is.

History

Beginnings of cricket in Tanzania

Cricket was first played in what is now Tanzania on the island of Zanzibar by the British Navy as recreation for the officers and crew. Cricket spread to Tanganyika after the British took over the League of Nations mandate in 1919.

Cricket began to be concentrated mostly on the coast and on Zanzibar, with particular development in Dar-es-Salaam. The Indian population quickly took up the game and by the 1930s formed the majority of the players, with a significant European minority.

National side

Early matches

Distance between Tanganyika and other countries in the African Great Lakes meant that the first international was not played until 1951, when Tanganyika lost by an innings to Kenya. Occasional matches against Kenya and Uganda continued throughout the 1950s and Zanzibar also played matches against Uganda, beginning in 1956.

Other opponents from further afield also toured, with Tanganyika playing the MCC in 1957 and 1963, a South African Non-Europeans side in 1958 (who also played Zanzibar) and Pakistan International Airlines in 1964. The occasional matches against Kenya and Uganda eventually led to a formal triangular tournament being introduced in 1967, later to become a quadrangular tournament with the addition of Zambia.

Decline

As many businesses were nationalised in the early 1970s, much of the Indian and British population began to leave the country. Cricketers, including John Solanky, who went on to play for Glamorgan, were amongst those who left the country, and standards went into decline.

Since the 1970s, the Tanzania Cricket Association has concentrated on developing the game amongst the African communities, and the national side now contains between 20 and 25% African players. The national side returned to form in the mid-1990s, when they were runners-up in two Africa-wide tournaments in 1994 and 1995, though there was again a slight decline in the late 1990s.

ICC membership

The Tanzania Cricket Association became an associate member of the ICC in 2001 (Tanzania had previously played international cricket as part of the combined East Africa and East and Central Africa teams) opening up new opportunities for Tanzanian cricket. The first matches for the national side as an ICC member were in the 2002 Africa Cup where they lost all four of their matches.

They showed improvement by the Africa Cricket Association Championship in 2004, where they still finished last, but did beat Zambia in the final match of the tournament, which was a qualifying event for the 2005 ICC Trophy. Even more improvement was shown in the equivalent tournament two years later, when they won Division Two of the World Cricket League Africa Region. This result qualified Tanzania for Division Three of the World Cricket League in Darwin in 2007. Tanzania finished sixth in that tournament after losing to Hong Kong in a play-off, which relegated them to Division Four.

In 2008, Tanzania hosted Division Four of the World Cricket League. In this tournament they finished fourth, which meant that they remained in Division Four for the next tournament in 2010, played in Italy, where they came 4th again, thus remaining for 2012 ICC World Cricket League Division Four

Tournament history

World Cup 

1975–1987: See East Africa cricket team
1992–2003: See East and Central Africa cricket team
2007: Did not qualify

World Cricket League 

2007: Division Three Sixth place
2008: Division Four 4th place
2010: Division Four 4th place
2012: Division Four 6th place
2014: Division Five 3rd place
2016: Division Five 5th place

ICC World Cup Qualifier 

1979–1986: See East Africa cricket team
1990–2001: See East and Central Africa cricket team
2005: Did not qualify

World Cricket League Africa Region 
Division Two 2006: Winners

ACA Africa T20 Cup
2022: Runners-up

Records and Statistics 

International Match Summary — Tanzania
 
Last updated 23 December 2022

Twenty20 International 

 Highest team total: 242/6 v. Mozambique on 2 November 2021 at Gahanga International Cricket Stadium, Kigali.
 Highest individual score: 90*, Arshan Jasani v. Kenya on 17 November 2021 at IPRC Cricket Ground, Kigali.
 Best individual bowling figures: 5/2, Yalinde Nkanya v. Cameroon on 9 December 2022 at IPRC Cricket Ground, Kigali.

Most T20I runs for Tanzania

Most T20I wickets for Tanzania

T20I record versus other nations

Records complete to T20I #1983. Last updated 23 December 2022.

Players

Current squad

This lists all the players who have played for Tanzania in the past 12 months or has been part of the latest T20I squad. Updated as of 23 December 2022.

Other notable players

The following players played for Tanzania or Tanganyika and also played first-class or List A cricket:

Pranlal Divecha – played one first-class match for East Africa.
Praful Mehta – played a One-Day International for East Africa in 1975.
CD Patel – played for East Africa in 1967.
RD Patel – played three first-class matches in the 1960s.
Malcolm Ronaldson – Played for Eastern Province in 1937/38.
John Solanky – Played for Glamorgan between 1972 and 1976.
Shiraz Sumar – Played an ODI for East Africa in 1975.
Vasant Tapu – Played two first-class matches for East Africa.
Suresh Raval – played for East Africa
Vishal amratlal bhadra valambhia... Played minor counties cricket in England and played for Buckingham town cricket club for home counties

International grounds

See also
 East Africa cricket team
 East and Central Africa cricket team
 List of Tanzania Twenty20 International cricketers
 Tanzania national women's cricket team
 Tanzania national under-19 cricket team

References

External links
 Official website
 Tanzania cricket team image

Cricket in Tanzania
National cricket teams
Cricket
Tanzania in international cricket